Iskuzhino (İsquja) is a rural locality (a village) in Kashkarovsky Selsoviet, Zilairsky District, Bashkortostan, Russia. The population was 183 as of 2010. There are 3 streets.

Geography 
Iskuzhino is located 30 km northeast of Zilair (the district's administrative centre) by road. Kashkarovo is the nearest rural locality.

References 

Rural localities in Zilairsky District